Angel in Séparée is a 1929 German silent film directed by Ernö Mayer and starring Elizza La Porta, Rolf von Goth and Sybill Morel. It was shot at the Grunewald Studios in Berlin. The film's art direction was by Mathieu Oostermann.

Cast
 Elizza La Porta
 Rolf von Goth
 Sybill Morel
 Robert Garrison
 Karl Falkenberg
 Gerhard Dammann
 Olga Engl

References

External links

1929 films
Films of the Weimar Republic
German silent feature films
German black-and-white films